Dharma is the third studio album by Colombian singer Sebastián Yatra, released by Universal Music Latino on January 28, 2022.

It won the Best Pop Vocal Album category at the 23rd Annual Latin Grammy Awards, Yatra's first win.

Background
In November 2021, Yatra released his breakout hit "Dos Oruguitas", from the Disney animated movie Encanto, which reached the number 2 spot on the Billboard Hot Latin Songs chart.

Commercial performance
Dharma debuted at number 12 on the US Billboard Top Latin Albums, including number 2 on the Latin Pop Albums chart with over 4,000 album equivalent units. In its first week, the album amassed over 2.3 billion streams.

Track listing

Charts

Weekly charts

Year-end charts

Certifications

References 

2022 albums
Sebastián Yatra albums
Universal Music Latino albums
Latin Grammy Award for Best Pop Vocal Album